Ha Duong Ngo is an academician, research scholar in the field of Electrical Engineering/Microsystems Engineering.

As the professor at the University of Applied Sciences Berlin and PI researcher of Microsensors technology at Fraunhofer Institute IZM Berlin, Professor Ngo initiated the research on surface micromachined actuators in microoptical applications, on SOI- and SiC-devices for use in extreme conditions (high temperature, corrosive) and on rGO for biosensing.

He contributed to the development of very fast micro mirrors for telecommunications, and development of a new class of AeroMEMS sensors as well as to the development of high temperature sensors for use in harsh environments.

Education 
Ha Duong Ngo studied Electrical Engineering in Vietnam, Electrical Enigeering in Ucraine (UdSSR) and Microsystem technologies in Germany. He received a PhD from Technical University Berlin in 2006, on Micro Opto-Electro Mechanical systems (MOEMS), a special class of Micro-electro- mechanical systems (MEMS) involved in sensing or manipulating optical signals.

By the end of 2006, Ha Duong Ngo joined the Electrical Faculty and Research Center for Microperipheric Technologies. He was the head of Microsensors and Actuator Technology Center at Technical University.

Presently, he is a professor at the University of Applied Sciences Berlin and a group leader microsensors technology and high-density integration at Fraunhofer Institute IZM Berlin.

Research and career
Professor Ngo's research interests include Microsystems Engineering, Sensor technology and development—Piezo-resistive Sensors, Gas Sensors and Silicon-on-insulator (SOI) technology and silicon carbide (SiC) technology.

Editorship
Professor Ngo has authored and co-authored more than eighty research papers & 10 patents. He is currently serving as Editor for MDPI (Microsensors, Micromachines) Journals, and as associate editor at Journal on Smart Sensing and Intelligent Systems.

He is also a member of AAAS and German Society for Material Research.

Publications
 Development and Characterization of a Novel Low-Cost Water-Level and Water Quality Monitoring Sensor by Using Enhanced Screen Printing Technology with PEDOT.
A WSi–WSiN–Pt Metallization Scheme for Silicon Carbide-Based High Temperature Microsystems. 
Advanced Liquid- Free, Piezo-resistive, SOI-Based Pressure Sensors for Measurements in Harsh Environments.

References 

Academic staff of HTW Berlin
Year of birth missing (living people)
Living people